The outcome of the Turkish general elections after 1983 is shown below. (After the coup d'etat in 1980 all political parties were closed by the military government. See also Turkish general elections before 1980.) In the table below only the percentage of the votes received by the parties which were qualified to send representatives to the parliament are shown. So the summation of percentages may be lower than 100%. The winner is shown in color. The legend of abbreviations is shown at the end of the table.

Legent of the abbreviations 
ANAP:Motherland Party
MDP:Nationalist Democracy Party
HP:People’s Party
DYP:True Path Party
RP:Welfare Party
Later FP:Virtue Party
SHP:Social Democratic Populist Party (after merging of SODEP and HP)
DSP:Democratic Left Party
CHP:Republican People’s Party (issued from SHP, later merged with SHP)
MHP:National Movement Party
AKP:Justice and Development Party

References 

General elections in Turkey
General, 1980+